Bradley John Murdoch (born 19 February 1958) is an Australian criminal serving life imprisonment for the July 2001 murder of English backpacker Peter Falconio in Australia. He will be 74 when eligible for parole in 2032. Murdoch is being held in Darwin Correctional Centre in Darwin, Northern Territory. He has lodged two appeals against his conviction, both of which were unsuccessful. The High Court of Australia refused special leave to appeal on 21 June 2007. He is forbidden to talk to the press.

Early life 
Murdoch was born on 19 February 1958 in Geraldton, Western Australia, an unexpected third son (the others were aged 11 and 14) to parents Colin Murdoch (a mechanic) and Nancy Murdoch (a hairdresser). The family lived in nearby Northampton, before moving to Perth when he was 12 years old. Murdoch had problems adjusting to city life, and soon became involved with a biker gang.

At 15 years old, he left high school and moved back to Geraldton where he started becoming involved in biker gang criminal activities. He also had his own trucking business, but declared bankruptcy in 1983. In 1980, he had met his partner Dianne, whom he married in July 1984 – they had a son, but they were separated by 1986 due to domestic violence. He was then employed as a truck driver (and illicit-drug smuggler), and admitted in court to smuggling large amounts of cannabis. He also began to display white supremacist tendencies (particularly in the wake of the 1992 Mabo decision), alongside a racist tattoo. By 1998, after release from prison, he was living in Derby, running drugs, and driving road trains, before resettling in Broome and running drugs to Sedan.

Previous criminal charges 
 In 1980, aged 21, Murdoch received a suspended sentence after being convicted of causing death by dangerous driving, after hitting and killing a motorcyclist.
 In November 1995, Murdoch started a 21-month imprisonment for the 20 August 1995 drunken incident of shooting at people who were celebrating at an indigenous Australian rules football grand-final match in the remote Kimberley region of Western Australia. He was released after 15 months.
 In 2003, he was charged with seven counts of abduction and rape, but was acquitted of these charges.

Peter Falconio trial and incarceration 

Shortly after his acquittal for unrelated rape and abduction charges, Murdoch was arrested in 2003 and charged with the murder of Peter Falconio on a remote part of the Stuart Highway near Barrow Creek on 14 July 2001. The case was heard before the Supreme Court of the Northern Territory in Darwin, and began on 17 October 2005. Murdoch pleaded not guilty to charges of murdering Peter Falconio and assaulting and attempting to kidnap his girlfriend Joanne Lees. Murdoch was convicted on 13 December 2005 for Falconio's murder. He was sentenced to life imprisonment with a non-parole period of 28 years. He was also convicted of other assault-related charges on Joanne Lees.

On 12 December 2006, he appealed against his life sentence in the Supreme Court, claiming the evidence of Lees was tainted because she had seen a photograph of him on the internet before she was interviewed by police, as well as an article linking him to the murder. The appeal was dismissed on 10 January 2007. In mid-August 2007, some sections of the Australian media speculated that Murdoch might soon reveal the whereabouts of Falconio's remains. Specifically, the press mentioned that Murdoch did not enjoy the conditions of the Berrimah Prison, on the outskirts of Darwin and might reveal the location of Falconio's body in exchange for a transfer to a prison in Western Australia, given that all avenues of appeal had been exhausted. An appeal to the High Court was unsuccessful. He launched another appeal to the Northern Territory criminal court of appeal in 2013; the appeal was later withdrawn by his lawyers in March of 2014 . 

In June 2020, a four-part documentary TV series was aired on UK TV Channel 4 entitled Murder in the Outback: The Falconio and Lees Mystery.

References 

1958 births
Living people
Criminals from Western Australia
Australian prisoners sentenced to life imprisonment
Prisoners sentenced to life imprisonment by the Northern Territory
Australian people convicted of murder
People convicted of murder by the Northern Territory
Murder convictions without a body
2001 murders in Australia
2000s in the Northern Territory